Battle of Kaniv may refer to:
 Battle of Kaniv (1662) — victory of Russians and Left-Bank Zaporozhian Cossacks against Yuri Khmelnytsky - see Kaniv#History
 Battle of Kaniv (1918) — victory of Germans against Poles